Mykhailo Iakovych Urytskyi (born June 3, 1965) is a Ukrainian puppet theater director, and a teacher at The Kyiv National I. K. Karpenko-Kary Theatre, Cinema and Television University.

Mykhailo Urytskyi is a laureate of international festivals and theater awards.

Biography 
First higher education – actor of the puppet theater (Kharkiv National Kotlyarevsky University of Arts from 1982 to 1988).

Second higher education – director of the puppet theater (Kyiv National I. K. Karpenko-Kary Theatre, Cinema and Television University from 2006 to 2007). M. Urytskyi is the author of the scientific work "Peculiarities of psychological perception of various forms of the puppet theater by children of preschool age".

For seven years M. Urytskyi worked as an actor in the Crimean Puppet Theater (Simferopol) under the direction of Boris Azarov. He embodied on the stage images in the plays "All Mice Love Cheese" Dyula Urban, "Shreds on the Scatter" by Grigoriy Oster, "The Upside Down Tale" by Donald Bisset, and "Snoogle" by John Priestley.

In 1994 Mykhailo left the theater and organized one of the first private puppet theaters in Ukraine – the theatre of fairytale "Harlequin" (Simferopol). The first director's productions are "The Steadfast Tin Soldier" and "The Princess and the Pea" by Hans Christian Andersen's fairy tales, Peter Yershov's "The Little Humpbacked Horse" (Konyok-Gorbunok), Atanas Popescu's "The Little Sunbeam", Carlo Gozzi's "The Love for Three Oranges".

Directing activity 
At the invitation of Sergei Efremov, an artistic director of the Kyiv Municipal Academic Puppet Theater, M. Urytskyi moved to Kyiv to take the post of the director of the theater. For 10 years of work he has staged 15 performances, which have brought 6 municipal prizes "Kyiv Pectoral" to the theater. (According to the data of 2017).

In addition to working in the Kyiv Theater, he performed productions in theaters of Ukraine (Odesa, Mykolaiv, Poltava, Simferopol), Russia (Volgograd, Krasnodar, Makhachkala, Naberezhnye Chelny, Tula, Yoshkar-Ola), Belarus (Maladzyechna), Lithuania (Panevėžys), Slovakia (Košice), Moldova (Chișinău) and others.

In his works Mykhailo refers to the folk tales of the world (The Magic Lamp of Aladdin, The Frog Princess, The Goat-Dereza, The Magic Swan Geese, The Magic Violin), the legacy of the classics of children's literature (Cinderella by Charles Perrault, "Why the long nose at the elephant" by Rudyard Kipling, "The Little Humpbacked Horse" (Konyok-Gorbunok) by Pyotr Yershov), works by contemporary authors ("The Magic Lotus" by Lyudmila Ulitskaya, "The Tired Devil" by Serhii Kovalev). According to his own confession, his favourite author is Hans Christian Andersen, whose tales formed the basis for more than 10 performances he staged ("The Nightingale", "The Steadfast Tin Soldier", "Thumbelina", "The Ugly Duckling", "The Princess and the Pea").

M. Urytskyi equally successfully works with the children's repertoire ("Puss in Boots" by Charles Perrault, "The Sunbeam" by Atanas Popescu, "Gasan – the Seeker for Happiness" by Eugene Speransky) and the performances for the adult audience ("A Midsummer Night's Dream" by William Shakespeare, "Oscar and the Lady in Pink" by Éric-Emmanuel Schmitt, "The Love for Three Oranges (fairy tale)|Love for the Three Oranges" by Carlo Gozzi). Realized a number of projects in the genre of musical theater (musical "Ali Baba and The forty Thieves" by Veniamin Smekhov to the music of Volodymyr Bystryakov, musical tale "The Adventures of Buratino" by Aleksey Tolstoy to the music of Alexey Rybnikov).

According to the data of 2017, M. Urytskyi has staged more than 50 performances.

Pedagogical and social activities 
From 2013 to 2015 M. Urytskyi served as a vice-president and a chairman of the commission for the protection of professional, social and material interests of UNIMA members. He is a theater curator of the project "Bylo ne bylo"].

Since 2008 Mykhailo Urytskyi has been working as a teacher at the Kyiv National I. K. Karpenko-Kary Theatre, Cinema and Television University (specialty "Actor of the Puppet Theater", "Directing the Puppet Theater"). Among the graduates there are directors Lyudmila Zemelko (Vinnytsia Regional Academic Puppet Theater), Marichka Vlasova (Zaporozhye Regional Puppet Theater); actors of the theater and cinema Tatiana Kazantseva, Pavel Borysenok, Maria Senko, Vasily Protsyuk, Yulia Olekseenko, Vladimir Shikalo and others.

Mykhailo Urytskyi lives and works in Kyiv.

Awards and recognition 
The director's works are awarded with numerous awards and prizes of the Kyiv, all-Ukrainian and international festivals, among which there are the Grand Prix 2008 of the International Theater Festival for Children and Youth "Luchafarul" (Iasi, Romania) for the performance "Nightingale" (Volgograd Regional Puppet Theater). He became a laureate in the category "Best Director" of the International Festival-Competition "INSPIRATION The international Theater Arts Competition-Festival" (Turku, Finland) for the performance "Thumbelina" (Dagestan State Puppet Theater); of the II International Festival of puppet theaters of the Caspian states "The Caspian coast" (Astrakhan, Russia) for the performance "The Steadfast Tin Soldier" (Dagestan State Puppet Theater); of the XIV International Festival of theaters for children "Іnterlyalka-2013" (Uzhhorod, Ukraine) for the performance "Thumbelina" (the Kyiv Municipal Academic Puppet Theater); of the XXIII International Festival of Puppet Theaters "SPOTKANIA" (Torun, Poland) for the performance "Oscar" (the Kyiv Municipal Academic Puppet Theater).

Mykhailo Urytskyi is a multiple winner of the theatrical award "Kyiv Pectoral" in the nominations "Best Performance for Children" (2012 – "Thumbelina", 2016 – "Why the long nose at the elephant"). He became the first and the only director for the present, who won in two main nominations of the Kyiv Pectoral: performance  (the Kyiv Municipal Academic Puppet Theater) was recognized by the experts of the award as the best by the results of 2016 in the nomination "Best Performance of the Dramatic Theater", and Mikhail Urytskyi became the laureates of the nomination "Best director's work".

References

External links 
 Mykhailo Urytskyi on the site of the Kyiv Municipal Academic Puppet Theater 
 Mykhailo Urytskyi on the site "Theatrical fishing" 
 Report of the TV channel "RenTV" (Naberezhnye Chelny) about two staging of Mykhailo Urytskyi in the city theater 

1965 births
Living people
Ukrainian theatre directors
Kyiv National I. K. Karpenko-Kary Theatre, Cinema and Television University alumni
Academic staff of Kyiv National I. K. Karpenko-Kary Theatre, Cinema and Television University
People from Simferopol
Entertainers from Kyiv